Wilbur Bernard Ware (September 8, 1923 – September 9, 1979) was an American jazz double bassist. He was a regular bassist for the Riverside record label in the 1950s, and recorded regularly in that decade with Johnny Griffin, Kenny Dorham, Kenny Drew, and Thelonious Monk. He also appeared on records released by J.R. Monterose, Toots Thielemans, Sonny Clark, Tina Brooks, Zoot Sims, and Grant Green, among others.

Career
Ware grew up in Chicago where he taught himself to play drums, banjo, bass while playing at church. In the 1940s, he worked with Stuff Smith, Sonny Stitt, and Roy Eldridge. He recorded with Sun Ra in the early 1950s. Later in the 1950s, settling in New York City, Ware played with Eddie Vinson, Art Blakey, and Buddy DeFranco. His only album recorded as a leader and released during his lifetime was The Chicago Sound, from 1957 when he worked for Riverside. He made jazz instructional albums for Music Minus One. In 1958, Ware was one of 57 jazz musicians to appear in the photograph A Great Day in Harlem.

Ware was a member of the Thelonious Monk quartet from 1957 to 1958. He also performed and recorded in 1957 with the Sonny Rollins Trio at the Village Vanguard. Largely self taught, Ware had an unorthodox but highly unique and percussive approach to the bass.

Ware's addiction to narcotics resulted in his return to Chicago in 1963, and then to a period of incarceration. He was inactive musically for about six years. In 1969, Ware played with Clifford Jordan, Elvin Jones and Sonny Rollins. He died from emphysema in Philadelphia, Pennsylvania, in 1979.

Discography

As leader
The Chicago Sound with Johnny Griffin (Riverside, 1957)
Super Bass (Wilbur Ware Institute, 2012) – With Clifford Jordan. Recorded for Strata-East in 1968, but not released for more than 40 years

As sideman
With Art Blakey
 Originally (Columbia, 1982)

With Tina Brooks
The Waiting Game (Blue Note, 1961)

With Sonny Clark
Dial "S" for Sonny (Blue Note, 1957)

With Walt Dickerson
Tell Us Only the Beautiful Things (Whynot, 1975)
Walt Dickerson 1976 (Whynot, 1976)

With Kenny Dorham
2 Horns / 2 Rhythm (Riverside, 1957)

With Kenny Drew
A Harry Warren Showcase (Judson, 1957)
A Harold Arlen Showcase (Judson, 1957)
I Love Jerome Kern (Riverside, 1957)
This Is New (Riverside, 1957)
Pal Joey (Riverside, 1957)

With Matthew Gee
Jazz by Gee (Riverside, 1956)

With Grant Green
Remembering (Blue Note, 1961)

With Johnny Griffin
Johnny Griffin (Argo, 1956)
Johnny Griffin Sextet (Riverside, 1958)
Way Out! (Riverside, 1958)

With Ernie Henry
Presenting Ernie Henry (Riverside, 1956)
Seven Standards and a Blues (Riverside, 1957)
Last Chorus (Riverside, 1956–57)

With Clifford Jordan
Jenkins, Jordan and Timmons (Prestige, 1957)]
Starting Time (Jazzland, 1961)
In the World (Strata-East, 1969 [1972])
Remembering Me-Me (Muse, 1977)

With Herbie Mann
The Jazz We Heard Last Summer (Savoy, 1957)

With Blue Mitchell
Big 6 (Riverside, 1958)

With Charles Moffett
The Gift (Savoy, 1969)

With Thelonious Monk
 Thelonious Himself (Riverside, 1957)
 Monk's Music (Riverside, 1957)
 Mulligan Meets Monk (Riverside, 1957)
 Thelonious Monk with John Coltrane (Jazzland, 1961)

With J. R. Monterose
J. R. Monterose (Blue Note, 1956)

With Lee Morgan
 Lee Morgan Indeed! (Blue Note, 1956)

With Cecil Payne
Zodiac (Strata-East, 1973)

With Rita Reys
The Cool Voice of Rita Reys (Columbia, 1956)

With Sonny Rollins
 Night at the Village Vanguard (Blue Note, 1958)

With Zoot Sims
Zoot! (Riverside, 1956)

With Toots Thielemans
Man Bites Harmonica! (Riverside, 1958)

References

External links
"At Once Old-Timey & Avant-Garde: The Innovation & Influence of Wilbur Ware"
Wilbur Ware Discography at www.JazzDiscography.com
Down Beat biography
[ Allmusic biography]
The Wilbur Ware Institute

1923 births
1979 deaths
Hard bop double-bassists
African-American musicians
American jazz double-bassists
Male double-bassists
Musicians from Philadelphia
Musicians from Chicago
Thelonious Monk
Riverside Records artists
20th-century American musicians
Deaths from emphysema
Jazz musicians from Illinois
Jazz musicians from Pennsylvania
20th-century double-bassists
American male jazz musicians
20th-century American male musicians